Major General Samantha Sooriyabandara RSP, USP was a Sri Lankan Army Major general and diplomat who commanded the 53 Division. He also served as the Defence Attache in the Sri Lanka Embassy in Washington D.C.

Early life and education

Sooriyabandara was educated at Nalanda College Colombo. He was a senior cadet in the school cadet core. Sooriyabandara's father was an officer in the Army, and was the first recruit soldier of the Sri Lanka Army after the English departed, with the Army registration number of No. 0001.

Military career

Sooriyabandara was an expert parachutist attached to the Sri Lanka Army Commando Regiment as a Commando.

During Operation Jayasikurui, the helicopter in which Samantha was traveling was shot down by the LTTE. The helicopter was destroyed and all its passengers and crew, except Soriyabandara died. Tamil fishermen helped save his life and in gratitude, he gifted his gold chain to them.

Sooriyabandara was the Commander of the 53 Division (Sri Lanka) regiment during the final phase of Sri Lankan civil war.
Earlier he was in charge of the personal security of the Commander of the Sri Lanka Army, Sarath Fonseka.

He was also an active member of Sri Lanka ex-service and Police Association Australia Inc.

References

 

 
 Funeral of Maj Gen Samantha Sooriyabandara
 Final Salute to a Honorable, Respectable, Courageous Soldier, Maj. Gen. Samantha Sooriyabandara
 Major Gen. Sooriyabandara dies prematurely : afflicted by the curse of the shawls- pension delayed
 An army is not its commander’s private fiefdom

Sri Lankan Buddhists
Sri Lankan major generals
Sinhalese military personnel
Alumni of Nalanda College, Colombo
Sri Lanka Military Academy graduates
Sri Lanka Army Commando officers
Date of birth missing
2012 deaths